Thomond RFC is an Irish rugby team based in Limerick. The colours of the club are blue and white.

History
Founded in 1944 after a meeting in the old boat club near the Old Distillery in Thomondgate, the club's first competitive match was in the Munster Junior League against Garryowen at Thomond Park on Sunday, 15 October 1944. Thomond ended up winning the match by 15 points to 3. Captained by Christopher ( Willie ) Beville who was also a co-founder.

Their home ground was named in honour of club stalwart Liam Fitzgerald, who served the club for many years. He started out as a player in the late 1950s, became club captain in the 1963/64 season and held the presidency in 1984/85. Known for being a tireless worker, he could often be seen digging drains amongst other things at the ground, which was previously named Woodview Park. Johnny Hanley was amongst the founding founders who gave them great support as did his sons Sean, Ger and Brendan Hanley.

Notable players

Ireland
 Jim Tydings
 Keith Earls
 Eddie Halvey

Munster
 Junior Morrison
 Keith Earls
 Declan Cusack jr
 Fintan Cross
 Maurice Hartery

Honours

 AIL Division 3: 2000/01
 Clare Cup: 1968/69, 1973/74, 1974/75, 1975/76, 1976/77, 1977/78, 1978/79, 1982/83
 Munster Junior Cup: 1970/71, 1979/80, 1980/81, 1984/85, 1988/89, 1989/90, 1990/91
 North Munster League: 1971/72, 1972/73, 1973/74, 1974/75, 1978/79, 1979/80, 1980/81, 1981/82, 1983/84, 1984/85, 1985/86, 1987/88, 1988/89, 1989/90, 1990/91
 Transfield Cup: 1968/69, 1971/72, 1972/73, 1973/74, 1975/76, 1978/79, 1981/82, 1982/83, 1989/90, 1991/92, 1996/97, 2001/02

References
 Thomond RFC

 
Irish rugby union teams
Rugby union clubs in County Limerick
Rugby union clubs in Limerick (city)
Rugby clubs established in 1944